Terateleotris aspro is a species of freshwater sleeper endemic to the Mekong basin in Laos.  It inhabits shallow backwaters with sand-gravel substrates.  This species grows to a length of  SL.  This species is the only known member of its genus.

References

Odontobutidae
Monotypic fish genera
Fish described in 1998